is a tram station operated by Tokyo Metropolitan Bureau of Transportation's  Tokyo Sakura Tram located in Kita, Tokyo Japan. It is 7.2 kilometres from the terminus of the Tokyo Sakura Tram at Minowabashi Station.

Layout
Nishigahara-yonchome Station has two opposed side platforms.

Surrounding area
 Musashino Junior & Senior High School

History
 August 20, 1911: Station opened

Railway stations in Tokyo
Railway stations in Japan opened in 1911
Kita, Tokyo